Allison Wolfe (born November 9, 1969) is a Los Angeles-based singer, songwriter, writer, and podcaster. As a founding member and lead singer of the punk rock band Bratmobile, she became one of the leading voices of the riot grrl movement.

Wolfe has also fronted other bands, including Sex Stains, Partyline, and Cold Cold Hearts. She was one of the principal creators of the original Ladyfest music festival in 2000. She has more recently been the creator and host of the punk rock interview podcast I'm In The Band.

Background
Allison Wolfe and her sister Cindy were born identical twins in Memphis, Tennessee, on November 9, 1969. Together with their sister Molly, they grew up in Olympia, Washington. Their parents divorced when they were all still young children, and they were raised by their mother, Pat Shively. A radical feminist and self-described lesbian, Shively founded Olympia's Eastside Women's Health Clinic in 1981. It was the first women's clinic in Thurston County, and throughout Shively's two decades of work it was the target of relentless anti-abortion demonstrations. The protests could be harrowing: Wolfe's mother endured verbal and physical abuse, and death threats forced her to go to the clinic armed and wearing a bulletproof vest. (The EWHC was razed in a fire in 2005, set by a still-unidentified arsonist.) Pat Shively died of ovarian cancer in February, 2000, and Wolfe credits her as being a lifelong influence, a feminist role model "almost too big to live up to."

In 1988, Wolfe spent time as an exchange student in Thailand's Krathum Baen District. She returned to attend Evergreen State College in Olympia, and later the University of Oregon at Eugene.

Music career

Bratmobile 
Wolfe and Molly Neuman wrote about rock music's pervasive sexism in their influential punkzines, Girl Germs and Riot Grrrl. They took those themes to music when they joined with Washington, DC guitarist Erin Smith to form their own band, Bratmobile, in 1991. Bratmobile performed at the International Pop Underground Convention in Olympia, Washington in August 1991. Maura Johnston later wrote in Rolling Stone that Wolfe's distinctive "disaffected drawl" became "one of the most prominent voices of the early-Nineties riot grrrl movement".

Bratmobile recorded for Kill Rock Stars, an Olympia-based independent label, and released their first full-length album, Pottymouth, in 1992. The band ended in a rancorous onstage breakup in New York City in 1994.

Cold Cold Hearts 
Wolfe and Smith eventually reunited to form Cold Cold Hearts with an expanded rhythm section provided by drummer Katherine Brown and bassist Natalie Mencinsky ("Nattles"). The band toured extensively and released one self-titled album in 1997.

Deep Lust 
Wolfe later sang with Deep Lust, her first band with male musicians which she lightheartedly describes as "my boy band". Deep Lust formed in early 1999; they toured and released one self-titled album on Kill Rock Stars in February 2000.

Bratmobile reunion 
Bratmobile reformed in 1999 and went on tour with Sleater Kinney. The reunited band released two more albums, Ladies, Women and Girls (2000) and Girls Get Busy (2002).

Partyline 
Wolfe started a Washington D.C. based band, Partyline, in 2004. The band released two full-length albums, Girls With Glasses (2005) and Zombie Terrorist (2006).

Sex Stains 
Sex Stains formed in Los Angeles in 2014. The five-person group was the largest outfit Wolfe had worked with yet, and the first in which she had a companion vocalist, Mecca Vazie Andrews. The band released their eponymous debut album on Don Giovanni Records in 2016.

After some personnel changes in 2017, the group was recast as Ex Stains, which performed shows with Wolfe on lead vocals until disbanding in mid-2018.

Other musical groups 
Wolfe has also performed and recorded with various other bands including Alice Bag, Cool Moms, Dig Yr Grave, Hawnay Troof and its offshoot, Baby Truth.

Other works 
Wolfe was one of the primary architects behind the original Ladyfest music festival in Olympia, Washington, in 2000. In later years, Ladyfest festivals have taken place throughout the world and Wolfe has appeared at many of them.

Wolfe holds a master's degree in arts journalism from the University of Southern California. In the 2000s she worked for The Washington Post'''', and edited the punk rock-themed manga series Nana, refashioning its basic English translation into modern vernacular. Since 2017 she has hosted I'm In The Band, a podcast on Tidal in which she interviews artists from the punk and indie rock scenes.

 With Bratmobile 
 Studio albums 
 Pottymouth (1993) LP/CD/CS (Kill Rock Stars)
 Ladies, Women and Girls (2000) CD/LP, (Lookout! Records)
 Girls Get Busy (2002) CD/LP (Lookout! Records)

 EPs 
 The Real Janelle (1994) LPEP/CDEP (Kill Rock Stars)

 Live albums 
 The Peel Session CDEP (Strange Fruit)

 Singles 
 Kiss & Ride 7-inch (Homestead Records)

 Split 7-inch 
 Tiger Trap/ Bratmobile split 7-inch (4-Letter Words)
 Heavens to Betsy/ Bratmobile split 7-inch (K Records)
 Brainiac/ Bratmobile split 7-inch (12X12)
 Veronica Lake/ Bratmobile split 7-inch (Simple Machines)

 Compilation appearances 
 Kill Rock Stars compilation, CD/LP, (Kill Rock Stars)
 A Wonderful Treat compilation cassette
 The Embassy Tapes cassette
 Throw compilation CD (Yoyo Recordings)
 International Pop Underground live LP/CD/CS (K Records)
 Neapolitan Metropolitan boxed 7-inch set (Simple Machines)
 Teen Beat 100 compilation 7-inch (Teen Beat)
 Julep compilation LP/CD (Yo Yo)
 Wakefield Vol. 2 V/A CD boxed set (Teen Beat)
 Plea For Peace Take Action compilation CD (Sub City)
 Boys Lie compilation CD (Lookout! Records)
 Yo Yo A Go Go 1999 compilation CD (Yoyo Recordings)
 Lookout! Freakout Episode 2 compilation CD (Lookout! Records)
 Songs For Cassavetes compilation CD (Better Looking Records)
 Lookout! Freakout Episode 3 CD (Lookout! Records)
 Turn-On Tune-In Lookout! DVD (Lookout! Records)

With Cold Cold Hearts
Studio albumsCold Cold Hearts (1997)

SinglesYer So Sweet (Baby Donut) (1996)

With PartylineGirls With Glasses 5-song demo CDR August 2004Girls With Glasses 6-song debut CDEP (Retard Disco) June 2005
Spider and the Webs/Partyline split 7-inch (Local Kid) October 2005Zombie Terrorist debut full-length CD (Retard Disco) October 24, 2006Bad For The Baby 7-inch (Moonflower Records) November, 2009

With Sex Stains
Studio albumsSex Stains'' (2016) CD/LP (Don Giovanni Records)

References

External links

1969 births
American women singers
American feminists
Women punk rock singers
Identical twins
Kill Rock Stars
American lesbian musicians
Riot grrrl musicians
Living people
Feminist musicians
American twins
Musicians from Memphis, Tennessee
LGBT people from Tennessee
Bratmobile members
University of Southern California alumni
People from Olympia, Washington
20th-century American LGBT people
21st-century American LGBT people
21st-century American women
Women in punk